This page lists all described genera and species of the spider family Toxopidae. , the World Spider Catalog accepts 87 species in 14 genera:

Gasparia

Gasparia Marples, 1956
 Gasparia busa Forster, 1970 — New Zealand
 Gasparia coriacea Forster, 1970 — New Zealand
 Gasparia delli (Forster, 1955) — New Zealand (Antipodes Is., Auckland Is., Campbell Is.)
 Gasparia dentata Forster, 1970 — New Zealand
 Gasparia edwardsi Forster, 1970 — New Zealand
 Gasparia kaiangaroa Forster, 1970 — New Zealand (Chatham Is.)
 Gasparia littoralis Forster, 1970 — New Zealand
 Gasparia lomasi Forster, 1970 — New Zealand
 Gasparia mangamuka Forster, 1970 — New Zealand
 Gasparia manneringi (Forster, 1964) — New Zealand (Snares Is.)
 Gasparia montana Forster, 1970 — New Zealand
 Gasparia nava Forster, 1970 — New Zealand
 Gasparia nebulosa Marples, 1956 (type) — New Zealand
 Gasparia nelsonensis Forster, 1970 — New Zealand
 Gasparia nuntia Forster, 1970 — New Zealand
 Gasparia oparara Forster, 1970 — New Zealand
 Gasparia parva Forster, 1970 — New Zealand
 Gasparia pluta Forster, 1970 — New Zealand
 Gasparia rupicola Forster, 1970 — New Zealand
 Gasparia rustica Forster, 1970 — New Zealand
 Gasparia tepakia Forster, 1970 — New Zealand
 Gasparia tuaiensis Forster, 1970 — New Zealand

Gohia

Gohia Dalmas, 1917
 Gohia clarki Forster, 1964 — New Zealand (Campbell Is.)
 Gohia falxiata (Hogg, 1909) (type) — New Zealand (Auckland Is.)
 Gohia isolata Forster, 1970 — New Zealand
 Gohia parisolata Forster, 1970 — New Zealand

Hapona

Hapona Forster, 1970
 Hapona amira Forster, 1970 — New Zealand
 Hapona aucklandensis (Forster, 1964) — New Zealand
 Hapona crypta (Forster, 1964) — New Zealand
 Hapona insula (Forster, 1964) — New Zealand
 Hapona marplesi (Forster, 1964) — New Zealand
 Hapona moana Forster, 1970 — New Zealand
 Hapona momona Forster, 1970 — New Zealand
 Hapona muscicola (Forster, 1964) — New Zealand
 Hapona otagoa (Forster, 1964) (type) — New Zealand
 Hapona paihia Forster, 1970 — New Zealand
 Hapona reinga Forster, 1970 — New Zealand
 Hapona salmoni (Forster, 1964) — New Zealand
 Hapona tararua Forster, 1970 — New Zealand

Hulua

Hulua Forster & Wilton, 1973
 Hulua convoluta Forster & Wilton, 1973 (type) — New Zealand
 Hulua manga Forster & Wilton, 1973 — New Zealand
 Hulua minima Forster & Wilton, 1973 — New Zealand
 Hulua pana Forster & Wilton, 1973 — New Zealand

Jamara

Jamara Davies, 1995
 Jamara pisinna Davies, 1995 (type) — Australia (Queensland)

Laestrygones

Laestrygones Urquhart, 1894
 Laestrygones albiceris Urquhart, 1894 (type) — New Zealand
 Laestrygones chathamensis Forster, 1970 — New Zealand (Chatham Is.)
 Laestrygones minutissimus (Hogg, 1909) — New Zealand (Auckland Is., Campbell Is.)
 Laestrygones otagoensis Forster, 1970 — New Zealand
 Laestrygones setosus Hickman, 1969 — Australia (Tasmania)
 Laestrygones westlandicus Forster, 1970 — New Zealand

Lamina

Lamina Forster, 1970
 Lamina minor Forster, 1970 (type) — New Zealand
 Lamina montana Forster, 1970 — New Zealand
 Lamina parana Forster, 1970 — New Zealand
 Lamina ulva Forster, 1970 — New Zealand

Midgee

Midgee Davies, 1995
 Midgee alta Davies, 1995 — Australia (Queensland)
 Midgee bellendenker Davies, 1995 — Australia (Queensland)
 Midgee binnaburra Davies, 1995 (type) — Australia (Queensland)
 Midgee littlei Davies, 1995 — Australia (Queensland)
 Midgee minuta Davies, 1995 — Australia (Queensland)
 Midgee monteithi Davies, 1995 — Australia (Queensland)
 Midgee parva Davies, 1995 — Australia (New South Wales)
 Midgee pumila Davies, 1995 — Australia (Queensland)
 Midgee thompsoni Davies, 1995 — Australia (Queensland)

Myro

Myro O. Pickard-Cambridge, 1876
 †Myro extinctus Petrunkevitch, 1958 — Palaeogene Baltic amber
 †Myro hirsutus Petrunkevitch, 1942 — Palaeogene Baltic amber
 Myro jeanneli Berland, 1947 — Crozet Is.
 Myro kerguelenensis O. Pickard-Cambridge, 1876 (type) — Kerguelen, Macquarie Is.
 Myro kerguelenensis crozetensis Enderlein, 1903 — Crozet Is.
 Myro maculatus Simon, 1903 — Australia (Tasmania)
 Myro marinus (Goyen, 1890) — New Zealand
 Myro paucispinosus Berland, 1947 — Marion Is., Crozet Is.
 Myro pumilus Ledoux, 1991 — Crozet Is.

Neomyro

Neomyro Forster & Wilton, 1973
 Neomyro amplius Forster & Wilton, 1973 — New Zealand
 Neomyro circe Forster & Wilton, 1973 — New Zealand
 Neomyro scitulus (Urquhart, 1891) (type) — New Zealand

Ommatauxesis

Ommatauxesis Simon, 1903
 Ommatauxesis macrops Simon, 1903 (type) — Australia (Tasmania)

Otagoa

Otagoa Forster, 1970
 Otagoa chathamensis Forster, 1970 — New Zealand
 Otagoa nova Forster, 1970 (type) — New Zealand
 Otagoa wiltoni Forster, 1970 — New Zealand

Toxops

Toxops Hickman, 1940
 Toxops montanus Hickman, 1940 (type) — Australia (Tasmania)

Toxopsoides

Toxopsoides Forster & Wilton, 1973
 Toxopsoides erici Smith, 2013 — Australia (Queensland, New South Wales)
 Toxopsoides huttoni Forster & Wilton, 1973 (type) — Southeastern Australia, New Zealand
 Toxopsoides kathleenae Smith, 2013 — Australia (New South Wales)
 Toxopsoides macleayi Smith, 2013 — Australia (New South Wales)

References

Toxopidae
Toxopidae